Thomas Dyer (January 13, 1805June 6, 1862) served as mayor of Chicago, Illinois (1856–1857) for the Democratic Party. He also served as the founding president of the Chicago Board of Trade.

Biography
Thomas Dyer was born in Canton, Connecticut on January 13, 1805.

He was a meat-packing partner of former mayor John Putnam Chapin, who was one of Chicago's first meat packers. Chapin built a slaughterhouse on the South Branch of the Chicago River in 1844.

Running as a "pro-Nebraska" Democrat (aligned with Stephen A. Douglas, who publicly backed his candidacy), Dyer won the contentious 1856 Chicago mayoral election, defeating former mayor Francis Cornwall Sherman (who ran as an anti-Nebraska candidate).

He died in Middletown, Connecticut on June 6, 1862, and was buried at Graceland Cemetery in Chicago.

References

External links
 Inaugural Address
 Biography of Mayor Dyer at Chicago Public Library site

1805 births
1862 deaths
Mayors of Chicago
19th-century American politicians
Meat industry
Meat processing in the United States
Burials at Graceland Cemetery (Chicago)